Frend or FREND may refer to:

Science 
 Front-end Robotics Enabling Near-term Demonstration (FREND), a DARPA project to enable grappling older satellites
 Fine-Resolution Epithermal Neutron Detector (FREND), an instrument on the ExoMars Trace Gas Orbiter

People 
 William Frend (social reformer) (1757–1841), English clergyman, social reformer and writer
 William Frend De Morgan (1839–1917), English potter
 Charles Frend (1909–1977), English film director
 William Hugh Clifford Frend (1916–2005), English ecclesiastical historian, archaeologist, and Anglican priest
 Ted Frend (1916–2006), a British motorcycle sports competitor
 George Frend (active 1987–2000), Irish hurling player
 Nicholas Frend (1985 - ), English television director

See also 
 Friend
 Freind